United Artists for African Rap (AURA) is a collective of 17 hip hop artists (plus one griot) coming from ten different countries in West Africa (Benin, Burkina Faso, Gambia, Guinea, Ivory Coast, Niger, Mali, Mauritania, Senegal and Togo) and who are committed to use their voices and music for Africa’s development. With the support of the Non Governmental Organization PLAN International, they are engaged in a public awareness campaign relating to Children’s rights and youth problems. With respect, they realized in 2006 the first ever hip hop musical comedy show “The extraordinary Stories of Poto-Poto Children”.

Members 

There are currently 17 members of AURA, originating from 10 different West African countries:

The artists’ underlying philosophy is that of Africanist optimism; they believe that Africa has the ability to overcome all her challenges and they are strongly focused on encouraging youth engagement to this end.  They contend that the youth represent the leaders of tomorrow and it is only by engaging Africa’s currently largely marginalised youth population that the continent has a chance of developing.

Poto-Poto Campaign 

AURA is currently engaged in a campaign designed to raise awareness about children’s rights and the problems that children are facing on a daily basis.  The campaign is called “Poto-Poto”; “Poto-Poto” translates as ‘mud’ and is also the colloquial name for the big African market.  It represents the children's home; many of whom are forced to wander the streets, sleeping in the market and eating bits of food that they find there.  The Poto-Poto campaign is centred on the production of a music album: “The extraordinary stories of the Poto-Poto children” (“Les histoires extraordinaires des enfants de Poto-Poto”).  In this album, each rap artist plays the role of a particular child, be it child soldier, child prostitute, victim of a forced marriage, drug dealer etc.  In the songs, the children meet to exchange their stories, to condemn or condone their friends’ ways of life and to ask questions about how such situations came about.  The use of rap in this way allows often sensitive topics to be broached in a way that young people are able to understand and relate to.

The songs not only address and raise awareness of problems, but they also portray the courage and humour that these children maintained.  Despite the hardships that they are subjected to on a daily basis, they maintain cheerful demeanours, coming together to draw strength from one another and to overcome their problems.

In 2007 two singles from the album were released: “Bienvenue a Poto-Poto” (“Welcome to Poto-Poto”) and “Poto-Poto Dancing”.  These were instant hits, taking top spots in music charts across the region of Francophone West Africa.  “Bienvenue a Poto-Poto” even made it to number 2 in the music charts on RFI (Radio France Internationale).  AURA's music is available to listen to free at their recently developed website: aurahiphop.com.

Events 

In addition to the Poto-Poto album, the artists have performed concerts across the region.  They theme each concert around a particular issue concerning children’s rights.  For example, at the St Louis Jazz Festival in May 2007, the artists sung about the problem of the talibé in Senegal (child beggars).
In 2007 they performed at local musical festivals in Senegal (St. Louis Festival, Dakar Banlieue Rhythmes Festival) and played regional concerts in Burkina Faso and Niger.  AURA also participated in a school tour in the Netherlands that was organised by Plan Holland; the artists met local students and performed their Poto-Poto songs, drawing attention to Africa's pressing problems.

A concert tour took place in 2008 in Mali, Senegal, Mauritania, Togo, Benin, Ivory Coast and Gambia.

Discography 

 2007 – AURA – The Extraordinary Stories of the Poto-Poto Children (CD)
 2010 – AURA – Bienvenue a Poto-Poto – Afrolution (compilation)

See also 

 Didier Awadi (PBS)
 Myriam (ALIF)
 Keyti (Rap’Adio)
 Moona
 Baay Sooley (PBS)

References

External links 
 
  AURA official website in French

International organizations based in Africa
African-American music in Africa
West African music
International music organizations